Lema cyanella is a species of beetle in family Chrysomelidae found in the Palearctic.

References

Criocerinae
Beetles described in 1758
Taxa named by Carl Linnaeus